George Henry Busby (June 10, 1794 – August 22, 1869) was a U.S. Representative from Ohio for one term from 1851 to 1853.

Biography 
Born in Davistown, Pennsylvania, Busby attended the public schools.
He moved to Ohio in 1810 with his father, who settled in Royalton, Fairfield County.
He engaged in the general mercantile business.
Major of militia in the War of 1812.
He moved to Marion County in 1823 and helped organize the town of Marion, where he continued mercantile pursuits.
He served as clerk of the Marion County courts and clerk of the supreme court 1824–1828.
Recorder of deeds 1831–1835.

Busby was elected as a Democrat to the Thirty-second Congress (March 4, 1851 – March 3, 1853).
He was not a candidate for renomination in 1852.
He resumed mercantile pursuits.
He served as member of the State senate 1853–1855.
Probate judge of Marion County from 1866 until his death in Marion, Ohio, August 22, 1869.
He was interred in Marion Cemetery.

Sources

1794 births
1869 deaths
People from Marion County, Ohio
American militia officers
Democratic Party members of the United States House of Representatives from Ohio
American militiamen in the War of 1812
19th-century American politicians
People from Fairfield County, Ohio